Leon "Pop" Bright, Jr. (born May 19, 1955 in Starke, Florida) is a former Gridiron football player in the Canadian Football League for four years and in the National Football League for five years.

He played high school football at Merritt Island High School in Merritt Island, Florida and was on the 1972 Merritt Island High, Florida Class AAAA state championship team.  Bright was named to the FHSAA's All-Century Team which selected the Top 33 players in the 100-year history of high school football in the state of Florida's history.

He played college football at Florida State University where he still holds the record for most yards on a kickoff return, which resulted in a touchdown.

From 1977-1980, Bright played running back, wide receiver, defensive back, and kickoff returner for the BC Lions.  He also played for the New York Giants from 1981–1983 and the Tampa Bay Buccaneers from 1984-1985.

Bright was selected to the Lions' 2004 50th Anniversary Dream Team.  In 2006, he was the head coach for the Daytona Beach Thunder arena football team.

Leon also runs the Leon Bright Charitable Foundation. His foundation works with under privileged kids and families.

He is the eldest of 10 children and also the eldest of 23 paternal grandchildren.  Bright and wife, Tammy, currently reside in Volusia County, Florida.  He has four children and four grandchildren.

See also
History of the New York Giants (1979-1993)

References

1955 births
Living people
American football return specialists
American football running backs
American players of Canadian football
BC Lions players
Canadian Football League Rookie of the Year Award winners
Canadian football return specialists
Canadian football running backs
Florida State Seminoles football players
New York Giants players
People from Starke, Florida
Players of American football from Florida
Tampa Bay Buccaneers players